The Summer Break Tour was a co-headlining concert tour by American boy band Big Time Rush and American singer Victoria Justice. This was Big Time Rush's fourth consecutive headlining tour, and Justice's second overall tour. The tour supported Big Time Rush's third studio album 24/Seven and Justice's music from the television show Victorious. The tour played 40 shows in North America.

Background
The Summer Break Tour was originally meant to be headlined solely by Big Time Rush. Victoria Justice, on the other hand, had been set to embark on her own summer tour called Here's 2 Us Tour, which she described as "a farewell tour" for Victorious fans after the show's cancellation. Several individual shows from Justice's tour were cancelled throughout the month of March, and it was officially announced on March 29, 2013 that her solo tour had been cancelled in favor of a co-headlined tour with Big Time Rush.

Opening acts
Olivia Somerlyn 
Jackson Guthy
G-Eazy (select dates)
Kik-It (Gilford)

Setlist

Shows

References

Victoria Justice
2013 concert tours
Co-headlining concert tours
Big Time Rush concert tours